Maxime Cressy was the defending champion but lost in the third round to Ulises Blanch.

Mikael Torpegaard won the title after defeating Yosuke Watanuki 6–3, 1–6, 6–1 in the final.

Seeds
All seeds receive a bye into the second round.

Draw

Finals

Top half

Section 1

Section 2

Bottom half

Section 3

Section 4

References

External links
Main draw
Qualifying draw

2020 ATP Challenger Tour
Cleveland Open